The Sultanate of Jambi (كسلطانن جمبي) was a region ruled by a sultan in northern Sumatra. The Dutch conquered the sultanate and killed the sultan in 1904. The sultanate has since been restored in recent years. The original sultanate was centered in the modern-day province of Jambi in Indonesia.

History 
There was an early reference to a seventh-century realm of Malayu based in Jambi, which was eventually absorbed into the Srivijaya empire as an autonomous trading community or a subject region. An account associated the early history of the sultanate with the Islamization of Sumatra, citing that these two events roughly coincided in the fifteenth century. The sultanate's access to natural resources as well as its strategic location, particularly its proximity to the Strait of Malacca, allowed it to flourish and be involved in international trade. By 1682, Jambi was disputed as a vassal state between the Dutch East India Company (VOC) and the Kingdom of Siam.

In the late 19th century the sultanate was slowly annexed by the Dutch, with the sultan degraded to a puppet ruler. This culminated in 1883 with the invasion of the Dutch-controlled Palembang by Jambi's Sultan, Mohammad Fakhruddin, which gave the Dutch the pretext to finally gain control of Jambi, forcing the sultan to accede to their authority and provide significant economic concessions. By 1907 the last vestiges of indigenous rule had been abolished.

Society 
As a society, Jambi has a history of being an entrepot and a trading center that is open to outsiders. This is demonstrated in the way Jambi families easily incorporate outsiders, particularly men as well as foreigners (e.g. Chinese and Arab traders) through marriage into the Jambi womenfolk. For instance, a Jambi pangeran (prince) adopted a Dutch official as his son, resulting to kinship obligations between the Dutch and the royal family.

References

Former sultanates
Precolonial states of Indonesia
Former countries in Southeast Asia